The Housatonic River Railroad Bridge is a historic bridge carrying Metro-North Railroad's New Haven Line trackage across the lower Housatonic River in the U.S. state of Connecticut. The bridge is also used by Amtrak for its Northeast Corridor services. It was listed on the National Register of Historic Places in 1987, which also refers to the bridge as the Devon Bridge. It is also referred to as the Devon Railroad Bridge by the state Department of Environmental Protection.

It is a "Scherzer Rolling Lift Bascule"-type bascule bridge.  It has a steel superstructure and block stone piers.  The moveable span is a Warren through truss span. The Connecticut River Railroad Bridge is another bridge of this type in Connecticut which is also NRHP-listed.

It is one of eight moveable bridges on the Amtrak route through Connecticut surveyed in one multiple property study in 1986.  The eight bridges from west to east are:  Mianus River Railroad Bridge at Cos Cob, built in 1904; Norwalk River Railroad Bridge at Norwalk, 1896; Saugatuck River Railroad Bridge at Westport, 1905; Pequonnock River Railroad Bridge at Bridgeport, 1902; Housatonic River Railroad Bridge, at Devon, 1906; Connecticut River Railroad Bridge, Old Saybrook-Old Lyme, 1907; Niantic River Bridge, East Lyme-Waterford, 1907; and Thames River Bridge, Groton, built in 1919.

History
The current bridge is the fourth railroad span in the same location, originally known as Naugatuck Junction. It was the longest covered bridge ever built in the state of Connecticut. Its completion finished the quadruple-tracking of the New Haven mainline from Woodlawn Junction to New Haven.

Repairs were planned for six months starting April 25, 2015.

See also

National Register of Historic Places listings in Fairfield County, Connecticut
List of bridges on the National Register of Historic Places in Connecticut

References

External links

9 HAER photos of the bridge, photos #49-#57

Bridges completed in 1904
Buildings and structures in Milford, Connecticut
Buildings and structures in Stratford, Connecticut
Bridges in Fairfield County, Connecticut
Bridges in New Haven County, Connecticut
New York, New Haven and Hartford Railroad bridges
Bascule bridges in the United States
Drawbridges on the National Register of Historic Places
National Register of Historic Places in Fairfield County, Connecticut
Railroad bridges on the National Register of Historic Places in Connecticut
Bridges over the Housatonic River
Steel bridges in the United States
Warren truss bridges in the United States
Howe truss bridges in the United States